King Christian II, Op. 27, is incidental music by Jean Sibelius for the Scandinavian historical play of the same name, written by his friend Adolf Paul. The original play deals with the love of King Christian II, ruler of Denmark, Sweden and Norway, for a Dutch girl, Dyvecke, a commoner. Sibelius composed in 1898 seven movements. He conducted the first performance of the first four parts the Swedish Theatre in Helsinki on 24 February 1898. In the following summer, he composed three more movements, Nocturne, Serenade and Ballad. The Nocturne was an interlude between the first act and the second. The position of the serenade changed. The ballad is a dramatic piece about the Stockholm Bloodbath (1520). This movement shows already traits of the later First Symphony. The stage music consists of the following numbers:

 Elegia
 Musette
 Menuetto
 Sången om korsspindeln
 Nocturne
 Serenade
 Ballade.

Sibelius derived from the incidental music a suite of five movements. A complete performance of the suite takes about 25 minutes. It was first performed in December 1898, conducted by Robert Kajanus. Sibelius wrote in a letter: “The music sounded excellent and the tempi seem to be right. I think this is the first time that I have managed to make something complete.”

Movements of the suite 
The suite consists of five movements:

References

External links 
 
 

1898 compositions
Suites by Jean Sibelius
Incidental music by Jean Sibelius
Stockholm Bloodbath
Cultural depictions of Christian II of Denmark